Crambus perlella is a species of moth of the family Crambidae. It is found in Europe and east across the Palearctic.

The wingspan is 19–28 mm. The face is rather prominent. Forewings very shining whitish, often ochreous -tinged ; veins and dorsal area often more or less broadly suffused with dark grey ; cilia shining white. Hindwings are grey, sometimes much suffused with ochreous -whitish,
sometimes posteriorly dark grey. The larva is light greygreenish or greyish-ochreous ; dorsal line darker ; spots brown ;head pale yellow -brown, darker-marked 

The moth flies from July to August depending on the location.

The larvae feed on various grasses. Adults feed on the nectar of Leucanthemum species.

References

External links
 Crambus perlella at UKmoths

Crambini
Moths described in 1763
Moths of Europe
Taxa named by Giovanni Antonio Scopoli